Tom Verica (born May 13, 1964) is an American actor, director, and producer, best known for his role as Sam Keating in the ABC drama How to Get Away with Murder (2014-2020). He also played Jack Pryor in the NBC critically acclaimed drama American Dreams from 2002-2004. As a director, he is known for Shonda Rhimes' dramas. He currently is an executive producer and director of the Netflix drama Bridgerton. From 2012 to 2018, Verica served as executive producer and director of ABC Scandal.

Life and career 
Verica was born on May 13, 1964, in Philadelphia, Pennsylvania, to real estate agent parents. He is of Italian descent on his father's side and German descent on his mother's side. His first television role was on the ABC daytime soap opera All My Children in 1987. He later had a recurring role in L.A. Law, and guest-starred on Home Improvement, Picket Fences, and NYPD Blue. In film, he appeared in Die Hard 2, Fathers' Day, Red Dragon, and Zodiac.

Verica was a regular cast member of the CBS primetime soap opera Central Park West from 1995 to 1996. He played astronaut Dick Gordon in the HBO miniseries From The Earth To The Moon (1998), appeared in The Naked Truth and Providence, and from 2002 to 2005 starred opposite Gail O'Grady in the NBC family drama, American Dreams. After the series was canceled, Verica guest-starred on Law & Order: Special Victims Unit, House, Boston Legal, Grey's Anatomy, and The Closer, and had recurring roles in The 4400 and The Nine.

In the early 2000s, Verica began his career as a television director. He directed the episodes of over 20 television shows, such as American Dreams, Boston Legal, Dirty Sexy Money, Ugly Betty, Army Wives, The Mentalist, and Body of Proof. He was a recurring director of Shonda Rhimes' dramas Grey's Anatomy, Private Practice, and Scandal. In Scandal he has served as co-executive producer since 2012. In 2014, he was cast opposite Viola Davis in the ShondaLand series, How to Get Away with Murder. From 2018 to 2019, he also produced For the People.

Filmography

Film

Television films

Television series

Director

References

External links

1964 births
Living people
Male actors from Philadelphia
American male film actors
American male television actors
American television directors
American people of Italian descent
20th-century American male actors
21st-century American male actors